Alice Hartley may refer to:

 Alice Maud Hartley (1864–1907), convicted in 1895 of killing Nevada state senator Murray D. Foley by gunshot
 Alice K. Hartley (1937–2017), American computer scientist and businesswoman